Pierre-Baptiste Baherlé (born 7 July 1991) is a French footballer who currently plays for FC Bassin d'Arcachon.

Career

Bassin d'Arcachon
On 18 January 2019 it was confirmed, that Baherlé had joined FC Bassin d'Arcachon.

References

External links
 

1993 births
Living people
French footballers
Sint-Truidense V.V. players
Belgian Pro League players
Challenger Pro League players
FC Chambly Oise players
US Boulogne players
Stade Bordelais (football) players
Royale Union Saint-Gilloise players
People from Cucq
Ligue 2 players
Championnat National players
Association football midfielders
Sportspeople from Pas-de-Calais
Footballers from Hauts-de-France
French expatriate sportspeople in Belgium
Expatriate footballers in Belgium
French expatriate footballers